Kalateh-ye Gavich (also Romanized as Kalāteh-ye Gāvīch) is a village in Gazik Rural District, Gazik District, Darmian County, South Khorasan Province, Iran. At the 2006 census, its population was 96.

References 

Populated places in Darmian County